The Ugaritic writing system is a cuneiform abjad (consonantal alphabet) used from around either 1400 BCE or 1300 BCE for Ugaritic, an extinct Northwest Semitic language, and discovered in Ugarit (modern Ras Al Shamra), Syria, in 1928. It has 30 letters. Other languages (particularly Hurrian) were occasionally written in the Ugaritic script in the area around Ugarit, although not elsewhere.

Clay tablets written in Ugaritic provide the earliest evidence of both the North Semitic and South Semitic orders of the alphabet, which gave rise to the alphabetic orders of the reduced Phoenician writing system and its descendants (including the Paleo-Hebrew aleph-bet, Hebrew, Syriac, Greek and Latin) on the one hand, and of the Ge'ez alphabet on the other which was also influenced by the ancient Egyptian Hieroglyphic writing system, and adapted for Amharic. The Arabic and Ancient South Arabian scripts are the only other Semitic alphabets which have letters for all or almost all of the 29 commonly reconstructed proto-Semitic consonant phonemes. (But note that several of these distinctions were only secondarily added to the Arabic alphabet by means of diacritic dots.) According to Manfried Dietrich and Oswald Loretz in Handbook of Ugaritic Studies (eds. Wilfred G. E. Watson and Nicholas Wyatt, 1999): "The language they [the 30 signs] represented could be described as an idiom which in terms of content seemed to be comparable to Canaanite texts, but from a phonological perspective, however, was more like Arabic" (82, 89, 614).

The script was written from left to right. Although cuneiform and pressed into clay, its symbols were unrelated to those of Akkadian cuneiform.

Function
Ugaritic was an augmented abjad. However, Ugaritic was unusual among early abjads in also writing vowels after the glottal stop.

The final consonantal letter of the alphabet, s2, has a disputed origin along with both "appended" glottals, but "The patent similarity of form between the Ugaritic symbol transliterated [s2], and the s-character of the later Northwest Semitic script makes a common origin likely, but the reason for the addition of this sign to the Ugaritic alphabet is unclear (compare Segert 1983:201-218; Dietrich and Loretz 1988).  In function, [s2] is like Ugaritic s, but only in certain words – other s-words are never written with [s2]."  The words that show s2 are predominantly borrowings, and thus it is often thought to be a late addition to the alphabet representing a foreign sound that could be approximated by native /s/; Huehnergard and Pardee make it the affricate /ts/.  Segert instead theorizes that it may have been syllabic /su/, and for this reason grouped with the other syllabic signs /ʔi/ and /ʔu/.

Probably the last three letters of the alphabet were originally developed for transcribing non-Ugaritic languages (texts in the Akkadian language and Hurrian language have been found written in the Ugaritic alphabet), and were then applied to write the Ugaritic language.  The three letters denoting glottal stop plus vowel combinations were used as simple vowel letters when writing other languages.

The only punctuation is a word divider.

Origin

At the time the Ugaritic script was in use (ca. 1300–1190 BCE), Ugarit, although not a great cultural or imperial centre, was located at the geographic centre of the literate world, among Egypt, Anatolia, Cyprus, Crete, and Mesopotamia. Ugaritic combined the system of the Semitic abjad with cuneiform writing methods (pressing a stylus into clay). However, scholars have searched in vain for graphic prototypes of the Ugaritic letters in Mesopotamian cuneiform. Recently, some have suggested that Ugaritic represents some form of the Proto-Sinaitic alphabet, the letter forms distorted as an adaptation to writing on clay with a stylus. (There may also have been a degree of influence from the poorly understood Byblos syllabary.) Other letters look similar as well: 𐎅 h resembles its assumed Greek cognate E, while  w,  p, and  θ are similar to Greek Y, Π, and Σ turned on their sides. Jared Diamond believes the alphabet was consciously designed, citing as evidence the possibility that the letters with the fewest strokes may have been the most frequent.

Abecedaries
Lists of Ugaritic letters (abecedaria, singular abecedarium) have been found in two alphabetic orders: the "Northern Semitic order" more similar to the one found in Phoenician, Hebrew and Arabic (the earlier, so-called ʾabjadī order), and more distantly, the Greek and Latin alphabets; and the "Southern Semitic order" more similar to the one found in the South Arabian, and the Ge'ez alphabets. The Ugaritic (U) letters are given in cuneiform and transcription, as well as in their Arabic (A), Hebrew (H), and Syriac (S) cognates; letters missing from Hebrew are left blank.

North Semitic

South Semitic

Letters

Unicode

Ugaritic script was added to the Unicode Standard in April, 2003 with the release of version 4.0.

The Unicode block for Ugaritic is U+10380–U+1039F:

Six letters for transliteration were added to the Latin Extended-D block in March 2019 with the release of Unicode 12.0:

See also

Old Persian cuneiform – a much later, unrelated attempt at a cuneiform semi-alphabet.

References

External links
Download a Ugaritic font (includes Unicode font)
Ugaritic cuneiform characters from the Unicode Ugaritic cuneiform script
Ugaritic cuneiform Omniglot entry on the subject
Ugaritic script (ancientscripts.com)
Ugaritic writing
GNU FreeFont Unicode font family with Ugaritic range in its sans-serif face.

Ugartic
Alphabet
Semitic writing systems
Obsolete writing systems
Cuneiform